Cenocentrum is a genus of flowering plants belonging to the family Malvaceae.

Its native range is Indo-China.

Species:
 Cenocentrum tonkinense Gagnep.

References

Malvaceae
Malvaceae genera